Marott's Shoes Building is a historic commercial building located at Indianapolis, Indiana.  It was built in 1899–1900, and is a seven-story, four bay, rectangular, Tudor Revival style building faced in white terra cotta. It has large Chicago style window openings on the upper floors. It features Tudor arched windows on the top floor and a crenellated parapet.  It is located next to the Lombard Building.

It was listed on the National Register of Historic Places in 1983.  It is located in the Washington Street-Monument Circle Historic District.

References

External links

Individually listed contributing properties to historic districts on the National Register in Indiana
Commercial buildings on the National Register of Historic Places in Indiana
Tudor Revival architecture in Indiana
Commercial buildings completed in 1900
Commercial buildings in Indianapolis
National Register of Historic Places in Indianapolis
Chicago school architecture in Indiana